Orne (or ) is a département in the northwest of France, named after the river Orne. It had a population of 279,942 in 2019.

History 
Orne is one of the original 83 départements created during the French Revolution, on 4 March 1790. It was created from parts of the former provinces of Normandy and Perche. It is the birthplace of Charlotte Corday, Girondist and the assassin of Jean-Paul Marat.

Geography 
Orne is in the region of Normandy neighbouring Eure, Eure-et-Loir, Sarthe, Manche, Mayenne, and Calvados. It is the only department of Normandy not to border the English Channel.

Economy 
The largest town by a considerable margin is the prefecture, Alençon, which is an administrative and commercial centre for what is still an overwhelmingly rural department. There are no large industrial centres, and agriculture remains the economic focus.

Demographics 

The inhabitants of the department are called Ornais.

The recorded population level peaked at 443,688 in 1836. Declining farm incomes and the lure of better prospects in the overseas empire led to a sustained reduction in population levels in many rural departments. By the time of the 1936 census, the recorded population stood at just 269,331. Once motor car ownership started to surge in the 1960s, employment opportunities became less restricted and by 1982, the population level had recovered a little to 295,000, after which it slowly decreased.

Principal towns

The most populous commune is Alençon, the prefecture. As of 2019, there are 5 communes with more than 5,000 inhabitants:

Politics

The president of the Departmental Council is Christophe de Balorre, elected in 2017.

Presidential elections 2nd round

Current National Assembly Representatives

Culture 
Alençon is the chief town of the Orne department.

Camembert, the village where Camembert cheese is made, is located in Orne.

The local dialect is known as Augeron.

Tourism

See also 
Cantons of the Orne department
Communes of the Orne department
Arrondissements of the Orne department
Haras National du Pin, a French stud farm

References

External links 
 Prefecture website
 Departmental Council website

 
 Orne Tourism
 AWOL in the Orne, in 1918 Life in the Orne, WW1 with images

 
1790 establishments in France
Departments of Normandy
States and territories established in 1790